Eric Clavering (1901–1989) was a British-born actor who spent much of his career in Canada. He played supporting roles in a number of British films during the Second World War. He later moved to Canada, and had a recurring role on the Canadian television series The Forest Rangers. He is currently buried at Beechwood Cemetery in Vaughan, Ontario.

Selected filmography

 Undercover Men (1934) - Madigan
 Thoroughbred (1936)
 Mr. Satan (1938) - Wilson
 Where's That Fire? (1939) - Hank Sullivan
 The Frozen Limits (1939) - Foxy
 Neutral Port (1940) - (uncredited)
 Sailors Three (1940) - Bartender
 Gasbags (1941) - Scharffuehrer
 The Patient Vanishes (1941) - Al Meason
 The Saint's Vacation (1941) - Reporter at door (uncredited)
 Facing the Music (1941)
 Tower of Terror (1941) - Riemers (uncredited)
 49th Parallel (1941) - Art
 The Saint Meets the Tiger (1941) - Frankie
 South American George (1941) - Mr. Durrant
 The Missing Million (1942) - Parker
 The Day Will Dawn (1942) - American Sailor at Bia Tonne in Oslo (uncredited)
 Front Line Kids (1942) - Carl
 Suspected Person (1942) - Roxy Dolan
 Much Too Shy (1942) - Robert Latimer
 The Saint Meets the Tiger (1943)
 Bush Pilot (1947)
 The Incredible Journey (1963) - Bert Oakes
 Isabel (1968) - Postmaster
 Smith! (1969) - Alexander (uncredited)
 To Kill a Clown (1972) - Stanley
 The Hard Part Begins (1973) - Ralph
 Sunday in the Country (1974) - Station Master
 Lions for Breakfast (1975) - Passer-by (uncredited)
 Sudden Fury (1975) - Station Attendant
 Welcome to Blood City (1977) - 1st Old Man
 Improper Channels (1981) - Wino
 Threshold (1981) - Old Man in Recovery (final film role)

References

Bibliography
 Hodgson, Michael. Patricia Roc. Author House, 2013.

External links

1901 births
1989 deaths
British emigrants to Canada
Canadian male film actors
Canadian male television actors
British male television actors
British male film actors
Male actors from London